Thomas Harrison (c. 1823-1894) was the first Government Surveyor of Jamaica. His maps have become an important historical resource for the island.

He was apprenticed to Edward McGeachy.

References

External links 

1820s births
Year of birth uncertain
1894 deaths
Surveyors
19th-century cartographers
Geography of Jamaica